Rafał Gan-Ganowicz (23 April 1932 – 22 November 2002) was a Polish soldier-in-exile, mercenary, journalist, member of the National Council of Poland, and political and social activist, dedicating his life to anti-communism.

Early life 
Rafał Gan-Ganowicz was born in Wawer-Warsaw on 23 April 1932. His family is descended from Tatars who settled in the Polish-Lithuanian Commonwealth in the 16th century. His father served in the French Foreign Legion for a time, and later traveled to South America for business, investing in a rubber plantation in Brazil and gold mines in Argentina. His mother was killed in September 1939 during the opening days of the German Invasion of Poland. After this, his father moved him and his son from Wawer to the Warsaw district of Żoliborz. They lived here until the Warsaw Uprising took place in August 1944. Leaving to fight in the uprising, his father hid him in a cellar with other children and women, but was killed in the battle, leaving Rafał an orphan at twelve years old.

As an orphaned teenager in post-war Poland, Gan-Ganowicz first experienced the aftermath of the Soviet Red Army's occupation of Poland. Witnessing the Soviet troops abuse of Poles, their looting and their destruction of personal property led him to first develop his anti-communism beliefs. One event that particularly stuck with him was seeing one of his friends, an older boy who had been maimed while fighting in the Warsaw Uprising, thrown down a flight of stairs and called a "bandit" by a communist official.

Around 1948, he had joined an underground anti-communist group of youths who protested and campaigned against the newly established Polish Communist government and the Soviets. They would deface communist propaganda posters, spray anti-communist graffiti, and publish and distribute leaflets critical of the government. At one point, the group was able to steal guns from Police officers. In June 1950, the Polish Secret Police started to round up all suspected members of any anti-state groups and Rafał was tipped off by a friend that they were about to arrest him. Fearing being tortured into giving up other members of the group, he boarded a Soviet supply train, hiding in the undercarriage, that was headed for Berlin and escaped Poland.

Western Europe and 'The Polish Guard' 
After arriving in Berlin, Gan-Ganowicz wandered around until he could find the western sector. He eventually turned himself over to the American authorities and he was granted political asylum due to his activities in Poland. Like many Polish refugees in the west, he joined The Polish Guard. This was a unit of the U.S. Army that was developed in cooperation with the Polish Government-in-exile for the purpose of guard, technical, and transport duties. He trained as a paratrooper and received the rank of Second Lieutenant, being given his beret by General Władysław Anders.

Being displeased with being stationed in Germany, due to his dislike of Germany for the invasion of Poland, he applied to be stationed in France instead. He had hoped that the unit would act as a commando group used in a NATO invasion of Eastern Europe in the early days of the Cold War, being dropped behind enemy lines in Poland. He was disappointed that this never happened and he spent most of his time in the unit on guard and patrol duties. After his time in the Polish Guard, he found a job as a teacher in a school for Polish refugees in Paris.

Mercenary activities 
While living in Paris, Rafał was motivated by his status as a political refugee, and not an economic one, to use his time in the west not to build a new life for himself, but to fight against communism.

The Congo 
In the 1960s, he had first started hearing news reports about the ongoing Congo Crisis. The new Prime Minister, Moïse Tshombe, had come to power after being in exile in Spain, and was now fighting against the Simba rebels, a Marxist/Nationalist group that was being supported by the Soviet Union, China, and Cuba. The rebellion became a key battle in the Cold War, and Tshombe called on western nations to assist him in the war, as well as European mercenaries to help his army. Rafał soon travelled to the Congo Embassy in Brussels and volunteered to fight, motivated by his strong anti-communist beliefs.

Yemen 

In 1967, Gan-Ganowicz traveled to Yemen under government contract from the King of Saudi Arabia to train local tribal insurgents against the Soviet-backed communist rebels during the North Yemen Civil War.

Later life 
On November 11, 1989, he was appointed a member of the National Council of the Republic of Poland from France in the eighth term (1989-1991) by President of the Polish Government-in-exile Ryszard Kaczorowski.

He died of lung cancer on November 22, 2002, at the age of 70. The funeral took place on November 26, 2002, in Lublin. He was buried in the cemetery in Kalinowszczyzna.

In 2007, president Lech Kaczyński posthumously awarded Ganowicz the Order of Polonia Restituta "for outstanding services in promoting democratic changes in Poland, for achievements in professional and social work undertaken for the benefit of the country".

References 

 https://www.youtube.com/watch?v=kUKZcVR58i8 'A Gun for Hire, or The Private War of Rafał Gan-Ganowicz'
 Mierzwa, Maciej: Rafał Gan-Ganowicz: zabijalem tylko komunistów... at Portal "Nowa Strategia"
 Chodakiewicz, Marek Jan. "Genocide Prevention by One Condottiere." The Institute of World Politics. N.p., 1 May 2009. Web. 28 Nov. 2016.

1932 births
2002 deaths
20th-century Polish journalists
Deaths from lung cancer
Military personnel from Warsaw
Polish anti-communists
Polish exiles
Polish mercenaries
People of the Congo Crisis
People of the North Yemen Civil War
Polish expatriates in France
Polish people of Lipka Tatar descent
Recipients of the Order of Polonia Restituta